The discography of American contemporary Christian music artist Francesca Battistelli consists of five studio albums, one Christmas album, five music videos, sixteen singles and eight other charted songs.

Albums

Studio albums

Compilation albums

Extended plays

Singles

Other charted songs

Notes

References

Pop music discographies
Discographies of American artists
Christian music discographies